The 2004 Calder Cup playoffs of the American Hockey League began on April 14, 2004. Twenty teams, the top five from each division, qualified for the playoffs. The fourth- and fifth-placed teams in each division played best-of-3 series in the qualifying round. The four winners, in addition to the other twelve teams that qualified, played best-of-7 series for division semifinals, finals and conference finals.  The conference champions played a best-of-7 series for the Calder Cup. The Calder Cup Final ended on June 6, 2004 with the Milwaukee Admirals defeating the Wilkes-Barre/Scranton Penguins four games to none to win the first Calder Cup in team history. Milwaukee's Wade Flaherty won the Jack A. Butterfield Trophy as AHL playoff MVP.

Records
Several league records were set during the 2004 Calder Cup Playoffs.
A total of 93 games were played throughout the playoffs, the most of any Calder Cup Playoffs
Wilkes-Barre/Scranton lost 12 times during the 2004 playoffs, the most games lost in a single playoff
Wilkes-Barre/Scranton also played in a record 11 overtime games in one playoff
There were 17 shutouts overall, the most in any single playoff
27 overtime games were played, the most in a single playoff
Milwaukee tied a record by recording six overtime victories in one playoff
Wade Flaherty became the first goaltender to win 16 games in a single playoff

Playoff seeds
After the 2003–04 AHL regular season, 20 teams qualified for the playoffs. The top five teams from each division qualified for the playoffs. The Milwaukee Admirals were the Western Conference regular season champions as well as the Macgregor Kilpatrick Trophy winners with the best overall regular season record. The Hartford Wolf Pack were the Eastern Conference regular season champions.

Eastern Conference

Atlantic Division
Hartford Wolf Pack – Eastern Conference regular season champions, 102 points 
Manchester Monarchs – 92 points
Worcester IceCats – 90 points
Providence Bruins – 87 points
Portland Pirates – 85 points

East Division
Philadelphia Phantoms –  101 points
Bridgeport Sound Tigers – 98 points
Wilkes-Barre/Scranton Penguins – 86 points
Binghamton Senators – 80 points
Norfolk Admirals – 79 points

Western Conference

North Division
Hamilton Bulldogs – 96 points
Syracuse Crunch – 93 points
Rochester Americans – 89 points
Cleveland Barons – 89 points
Toronto Roadrunners – 81 points

West Division
Milwaukee Admirals – Western Conference regular season champions; Macgregor Kilpatrick Trophy winners, 102 points
Chicago Wolves – 96 points
Grand Rapids Griffins – 96 points
Houston Aeros – 74 points
Cincinnati Mighty Ducks – 72 points

Bracket

In the qualification round all games are played at the arena of the fourth seed. In each round after the Qualification Round, the higher seed receives home ice advantage, meaning they can play a maximum of four home games if the series reaches seven games. There is no set series format for each series after the Qualification Round due to arena scheduling conflicts and travel considerations.

Division Qualifiers
Note 1: All times are in Eastern Time (UTC−4).
Note 2: Game times in italics signify games to be played only if necessary.
Note 3: Home team is listed first.

Eastern Conference

Atlantic Division

(A4) Providence Bruins vs. (A5) Portland Pirates

East Division

(E4) Binghamton Senators vs. (E5) Norfolk Admirals

Western Conference

North Division

(N4) Cleveland Barons vs. (N5) Toronto Roadrunners

West Division

(W4) Houston Aeros vs. (W5) Cincinnati Mighty Ducks

Division Semifinals

Eastern Conference

Atlantic Division

(A1) Hartford Wolf Pack vs. (A5) Portland Pirates

(A2) Manchester Monarchs vs. (A3) Worcester IceCats

East Division

(E1) Philadelphia Phantoms vs. (E5) Norfolk Admirals

(E2) Bridgeport Sound Tigers vs. (E3) Wilkes-Barre/Scranton Penguins

Western Conference

North Division

(N1) Hamilton Bulldogs vs. (N4) Cleveland Barons

(N2) Syracuse Crunch vs. (N3) Rochester Americans

West Division

(W1) Milwaukee Admirals vs. (W5) Cincinnati Mighty Ducks

(W2) Grand Rapids Griffins vs. (W3) Chicago Wolves

Division Finals

Eastern Conference

Atlantic Division

(A1) Hartford Wolf Pack vs. (A3) Worcester IceCats

East Division

(E1) Philadelphia Phantoms vs. (E3) Wilkes-Barre/Scranton Penguins

Western Conference

North Division

(N1) Hamilton Bulldogs vs. (N3) Rochester Americans

West Division

(W1) Milwaukee Admirals vs. (W3) Chicago Wolves

Conference finals

Eastern Conference

(A1) Hartford Wolf Pack vs. (E3) Wilkes-Barre/Scranton Penguins

Western Conference

(W1) Milwaukee Admirals vs. (N3) Rochester Americans

1 – Game played at HSBC Arena – Buffalo, NY
2 – Game played at Blue Cross Arena at the War Memorial – Rochester, New York

Calder Cup Final

(W1) Milwaukee Admirals vs. (E3) Wilkes-Barre/Scranton Penguins

See also
2003–04 AHL season
List of AHL seasons

References

Calder Cup playoffs
Calder Cup